Hradisko is a village and municipality in Kežmarok District in the Prešov Region of north Slovakia.

History
In historical records the village was first mentioned in 1264. Hradisko had been known also by its German name Kuntschhöfchen.

Geography
The municipality lies at an altitude of 840 metres and covers an area of 2.635 km².
It has a population of about 100 people.

See also
 List of municipalities and towns in Slovakia
 Ján Kellner, Slovak missionary to USSR, born in Hradisko, 1912.

References

Genealogical resources

The records for genealogical research are available at the state archive "Statny Archiv in Levoca, Slovakia"

 Roman Catholic church records (births/marriages/deaths): 1674-1900 (parish B)
 Lutheran church records (births/marriages/deaths): 1874-1944 (parish B)

External links

https://web.archive.org/web/20160731201302/http://hradisko.e-obce.sk/
Surnames of living people in Hradisko

Villages and municipalities in Kežmarok District